is a Japanese professional footballer who currently plays as a midfielder for Tokyo United.

Club career

Albirex Niigata (S)
Ishihara joined the White Swans for the 2020 season after completion of his University study.

Iwate Grulla Morioka
After a successful career with the White Swans in 2020, he moved to J3 club, Iwate Grulla Morioka for the 2021 season.

Tokyo Musashino United FC
On 2 February 2022, Kurishima signed to JFL club, Tokyo Musashino United for ahead of 2022 season.

Tokyo United FC
On 15 January 2023, Kurishima announcement officially signing transfer to Kanto Soccer League club, Tokyo United for ahead of 2023 season.

Career statistics

Club

Notes

References

1997 births
Living people
Association football people from Chiba Prefecture
Waseda University alumni
Japanese footballers
Japanese expatriate footballers
Association football midfielders
Singapore Premier League players
J3 League players
Japan Football League players
Albirex Niigata Singapore FC players
Iwate Grulla Morioka players
Tokyo Musashino United FC players
Tokyo United FC players
Japanese expatriate sportspeople in Singapore
Expatriate footballers in Singapore